William Dingwall Fordyce (31 March 1836 – 27 November 1875) was a Scottish Liberal politician. He was elected MP in 1866 to represent Aberdeenshire and, following the reorganisation of constituencies by the Representation of the People (Scotland) Act 1868, on 20 November 1868 to represent East Aberdeenshire.

He pioneered benefits for his tenants, such as insurance for their cottages, and sent carriages to Banff, Peterhead and Aberdeen each week, so that they had greater mobility. He drove through gaming laws to aid the rural economy and created a railway station at Maud, which is now a part-time museum. On his death in 1875, aged 39, the Culsh Monument was built for him by tenant subscription and designed by James Matthews. He was buried on his estate at Brucklay Castle, where an obelisk marks his grave.

References

Bibliography

External links 
 

1836 births
1875 deaths
Scottish Liberal Party MPs
Members of the Parliament of the United Kingdom for Scottish constituencies
UK MPs 1865–1868
UK MPs 1868–1874
UK MPs 1874–1880
19th-century Scottish people